The Church of the Advent is an Episcopal parish in Boston, Massachusetts, United States. The church is housed in a Victorian Gothic building, faced in brick with eight large change ringing bells and a 172-foot spire. It has long been a prominent center of Anglo-Catholic worship.

Location
The church building is located at 30 Brimmer Street at the corner of Mount Vernon and Brimmer Streets on the "flat" of Beacon Hill. It is next door to the historic Charles Street Meeting House.

History

The church was begun in 1844 by a group who wished to implement the ideals of the new Oxford Movement, then about a decade old in England. The founders defied the widespread custom of renting pews, whereby those who had the means leased the best seats, often from generation to generation. Servants and the poor were relegated to places in the back or in the galleries. Such pew rents provided income for churches but also effectively excluded those who could not afford them, thereby enforcing social distinctions contrary to the essential nature of Christianity. Founders wrote in the parish charter that their intention was "to secure to a portion of the City of Boston the ministrations of the Holy Catholic Church, and more especially to secure the same to the poor and needy, in a manner free from unnecessary expense and all ungracious circumstances."

In 1872, Charles Chapman Grafton became the Advent's fourth rector. It was during his tenure that construction began on the parish's permanent home, the Gothic Revival structure on Brimmer Street on the "flat" of Beacon Hill. Previously the congregation had moved from its first meeting space, an "upper room" in a building on Merrimack Street, to rented space in a building near Causeway Street, and later to a church on Green Street in Boston's since-demolished West End. From it moved to a disused Congregational church on Bowdoin Street on the other side of the Hill.(This building served as the Church of St. John the Evangelist until 2015.) Father Grafton was elected bishop of the Diocese of Fond du Lac, Wisconsin, in 1888 but returned in 1894 to preach and consecrate the completed Brimmer Street church on Advent Sunday, December 1 – fifty years to the day after the parish's first services in the North End loft.

In 1936, parishioner and master organ-builder, G. Donald Harrison of the Aeolian-Skinner Company, designed and installed a pipe organ which remains a world-renowned masterpiece of the art.

A more recent parishioner, Jonathan Daniels, died in Alabama during the Civil Rights Movement in 1965.  Also of note is the parish's thirteenth pastor, Richard Holloway, who subsequently became Bishop of Edinburgh and Primus of the Scottish Episcopal Church.

References

External links

Church history from parish website
Historical Resources on the Church of the Advent, Boston from Project Canterbury

Episcopal church buildings in Massachusetts
Episcopal churches in Boston
Anglo-Catholic church buildings in the United States
19th-century Episcopal church buildings
1844 establishments in Massachusetts